Eva María Moral Pedrero also simply known as Eva Moral (born 30 July 1982) is a Spanish paratriathlete. She made her maiden Paralympic appearance representing Spain at the 2020 Summer Paralympics.

Career 
She took up the sport of paratriathlon at the age of 32 in 2014 and also took part in able bodied triathlon events before her accident.

She claimed bronze medal in the 2020 Tokyo|PTWC at the 2020 Summer Paralympics.

References 

1982 births
Spanish female triathletes
Paratriathletes at the 2020 Summer Paralympics
Paralympic medalists in paratriathlon
Medalists at the 2020 Summer Paralympics
Paralympic bronze medalists for Spain
Athletes from Madrid
Paratriathletes of Spain
Living people
21st-century Spanish women